Yeluri Sambasiva Rao is an Indian politician and businessman from Andhra Pradesh. He is the chairman of Nova Agri Group, a leading manufacturer of Agri Inputs in the Indian market. He is also the incumbent MLA of the Parchur constituency who won the 2019 elections from Telugu Desam Party the current Opposition party in the state of Andhra Pradesh. He was first elected as a Member of Legislative Assembly for the Parchur constituency in the year 2014. Yeluri was from Konanki village, Martur Mandal and won with more than 10000 votes margin in 2014 general elections. He was famous in Parchur constituency for his charity works through Yeluri Charitable trust, an NGO working in this region, TDP chief Chandrababu Naidu stated even before the 2014 elections that Parchur will be the first seat for TDP to win in Prakasam District. Yeluri is the first one to defeat Daggubati Venketeswara Rao in assembly elections 2019.

Early life and education 
Sambasiva Rao was born in Konakki village of Martur mandal in then Prakasam district.

References

Year of birth missing (living people)
Living people
Andhra Pradesh politicians
Andhra Pradesh MLAs 2019–2024
Telugu Desam Party politicians